Lene Rantala (born 10 August 1968 in Copenhagen) is a former Danish team handball player, two times Olympic champion and a World champion. Rantala is currently goalkeeping coach for Vipers Kristiansand in the Norwegian Eliteserien. 

She debuted on the Danish national team on 14 February 1991, and has since played 226 matches for Denmark. She has won numerous medals with the team, notably including two Olympic gold medals at the 1996 Summer Olympics in Atlanta and at the 2000 Summer Olympics in Sydney.

Personal life
Rantala is of Finnish descent through her paternal grandmother.

References

External links

1968 births
Living people
Danish female handball players
Olympic gold medalists for Denmark
Handball players at the 1996 Summer Olympics
Handball players at the 2000 Summer Olympics
Expatriate handball players
Danish expatriate sportspeople in Norway
Handball players from Copenhagen
Olympic medalists in handball
Danish people of Finnish descent
Medalists at the 2000 Summer Olympics
Medalists at the 1996 Summer Olympics